Neilson may refer to:

Places 
 Zec Batiscan-Neilson, in the Portneuf Regional County Municipality, Quebec, Canada
 Neilson Township, in Portneuf Regional County Municipality, Quebec, Canada
 Neilson River (Bras du Nord), Saint-Raymond, Portneuf Regional County Municipality, Quebec, Canada

Business 
 Neilson Dairy, or William Neilson Dairy Limited, a Canadian dairy company
 Neilson and Company, 19th century locomotive manufacturer in Glasgow, Scotland

Other uses 
 Neilson (name), people with the given name or surname
 Roger Neilson Memorial Award, annual award for the top academic College/University player in the Ontario Hockey League

See also
 Nielsen (disambiguation)
 Neilston, a village and parish in East Renfrewshire in the west central Lowlands of Scotland